Jackson Thomas "Buddy" Boeheim (born November 11, 1999) is an American professional basketball player for the Detroit Pistons of the National Basketball Association (NBA), on a two-way contract with the Motor City Cruise of the NBA G League. He played for the Syracuse Orange. He is the son of Hall of Fame basketball coach Jim Boeheim.

High school career
Boeheim attended Jamesville-DeWitt High School in DeWitt, New York. As a junior, he averaged 26.3 points and 9.8 rebounds per game, leading his team to a Class A Section III title, and was named All-Central New York Large School Player of the Year. For his senior season, Boeheim transferred to Brewster Academy in Wolfeboro, New Hampshire, where he served as team captain. He committed to playing college basketball at Syracuse, where his father was serving as head coach, over offers from Gonzaga and UMass.

College career
Boeheim came off the bench in his freshman season at Syracuse, averaging 6.8 points per game. He entered the starting lineup as a sophomore and averaged 15.3 points. On March 11, 2021, Boeheim scored a career-high 31 points in a 72–69 loss to Virginia at the ACC tournament quarterfinals. In his next game, on March 19, he scored 30 points in a 78–62 first round win over sixth-seeded San Diego State at the NCAA tournament. As a junior, Boeheim averaged 17.8 points and 2.6 assists per game, while shooting 38.3 percent from three-point range. He was named to the First Team All-ACC as a senior.

Professional career

Detroit Pistons (2022–present) 
After going undrafted in the 2022 NBA draft, Boeheim signed a two-way contract with the Detroit Pistons. Boeheim later joined the Pistons' 2022 NBA Summer League team. In his Summer League debut, Boeheim scored no points, going 0-for-2 from the field in around nine minutes in an 81–78 win against the Portland Trail Blazers.  Four nights later he scored a team-high 18 points for the Pistons in a loss to the Indiana Pacers.

Career statistics

College

|-
| style="text-align:left;"| 2018–19
| style="text-align:left;"| Syracuse
| 32 || 5 || 17.1 || .381 || .353 || .788 || 1.6 || 1.0 || .6 || .1 || 6.8
|-
| style="text-align:left;"| 2019–20
| style="text-align:left;"| Syracuse
| 32 || 32 || 35.6 || .407 || .370 || .714 || 1.9 || 2.2 || 1.1 || .2 || 15.3
|-
| style="text-align:left;"| 2020–21
| style="text-align:left;"| Syracuse
| 25 || 25 || 36.2 || .433 || .383 || .849 || 2.6 || 2.6 || 1.3 || .0 || 17.8
|-
| style="text-align:left;"| 2021–22
| style="text-align:left;"| Syracuse
| 32 || 32 || 38.0 || .406 || .341 || .884 || 3.4 || 3.1 || 1.5 || .1 || 19.2
|- class="sortbottom"
| style="text-align:center;" colspan="2"| Career
| 121 || 94 || 31.5 || .410 || .362 || .827 || 2.4 || 2.2 || 1.1 || .1 || 14.6

Personal life
His father is Hall of Fame basketball coach Jim Boeheim, for whom he played at Syracuse. Two of his siblings play college basketball: his older brother, Jimmy, who played with him at Syracuse, and his twin sister, Jamie, at Rochester.

References

External links
Syracuse Orange bio

1999 births
Living people
American men's basketball players
American twins
Basketball players from New York (state)
Brewster Academy alumni
Detroit Pistons players
People from Fayetteville, New York
Shooting guards
Syracuse Orange men's basketball players
Undrafted National Basketball Association players